Paternal Balšić family members in bold.

Balša I (fl. 1356–1362)
Stracimir
Đurađ II Balšić
Balša III
Jelena (married herzog Stjepan Vukčić Kosača)
Vladislav Hercegović
Petar
Matija
Miklos
Ivan
Andrija
Tomaš
Unknown Daughter
Unknown Daughter
Vladislav Hercegović
Katarina, married King of Bosnia Stephen Thomas
Sigismund (Šimun) Kotromanić (converted to Islam and changed his name to Ishak-beg Kraljević (Ishak-bey Kraloglu))
Katarina Kotromanić
Vlatko Hercegović
Marija
Jovan Hercegović
Isabella
Sava
Vlatko
Giovanni
Vlatko
Elisabeta
Ferante
Unknown Son
Teodora (Dorotea)
Đurađ I with Olivera Mrnjavčević (first wife) and Teodora Dejanović Dragaš (second wife)
Jelisaveta (or Jelisanta)
Unknown Child
Jelena
Nikola
Jakov
Monćino
Dabiživ Monetić
Goisava
Jevdokija (Eudokia), married Esau de' Buondelmonti, ruler of Epirus 1385–1411)
Giorgio de' Buondelmonti, ruler of Epirus 1411
Konstantin (Košta) (married Helena Thopia, a daughter of Karl Thopia)
Stefan Balšić "Maramonte" (fl. 1419–40), pretender to Zeta
Đorđe
Đorđe
Another son
Jelena
Đurađ (illegitimate), his son Stefan Strez Balšić married Vlajka Kastrioti (Skanderbeg's sister) and had two sons: Ivan and Gojko who in 1444 were among the founders of the League of Lezhë.
Balša II married Comita Muzaka († 1392), daughter of Andrea II Muzaka, Despot of Berat) 
Ruđina
Vojislava, married Karl Topia, the "Prince of Albania", with whom she had one son, Gjergj Thopia, Duke of Durazzo, and two daughters, Elena Thopia, Lady of Krujë, married Konstantin Balšić, and Vojislava

References

Family trees